Isaac Royall Jr. (1719–1781) was the largest slaveholder in 18th-century Massachusetts. His wealth, primarily accrued through enslaved labor in Antigua, made possible the creation of Harvard Law School. Royall and his father enslaved 64 people on the family's estate in today's Medford, Massachusetts. The Isaac Royall House is now a museum and historic site. The property includes the only surviving freestanding slave quarters in the northern United States.

Life

Isaac Royall Jr. was the son of slave trader and planter Isaac Royall (1672–1739). The elder Royall had moved from Massachusetts to Antigua in 1700 to establish a slave-labor plantation and made his fortune trading enslaved people, rum, and sugar. Isaac was born on the island in 1719. He was 17 when Antiguan officials carried out a brutal wave of punishments in anticipation of an uprising by enslaved workers. "A total of 132 enslaved persons were convicted, and 88 executed: five by being broken on the wheel, six by gibbeting, and 77 by burning at the stake." Despite recent claims, however, there is no evidence that Royall father or son played a role in suppressing the revolt. "The executed individuals were held in bondage by a total of 60 different individuals and estates," including one man owned by Royall's father. When Hector was burned at the stake, "Isaac Royall Sr. received £70 in compensation for his loss."

Harsh weather and disease cut into Royalls' Antiguan profits, including a drought in 1725, a massive hurricane in 1733, earthquakes in 1735, and a smallpox epidemic in 1737. Determined to return to New England, Royall Sr. bought a 500-acre estate in Charlestown, Massachusetts (now Medford), near the Mystic River known as Ten Hills Farm. The property was originally owned and named by the colony's first governor, John Winthrop. In 1737, the family moved to the estate, bringing with them at least 27 enslaved people, making the Royalls "the largest slaveholding family in Massachusetts." The estate included a three-story Georgian mansion (expanded from an earlier, more modest structure), a carriage house, a stable, an "out kitchen," and a number of barns. After Isaac Sr. died in 1739, Isaac Jr., then twenty years old, inherited his father's estate, variously described as "immense" and "small but prosperous." The property, now known as the Isaac Royall House, is a museum and historic site. It includes the only surviving example of freestanding slave quarters in the northern United States. The Royalls are known to have enslaved 64 people in Medford.

Like his father, Royall became a merchant mariner and, at 23, bought people and property to establish his own Antiguan sugar plantation. Slave labor made Royall one of New England's wealthiest men. He actively invested in real estate, purchased silver from Paul Revere, traveled in a coach-and-four with liveried servants, bought fine china and furniture from abroad, and hosted lavish parties.  Royall held a number of civic offices, serving as justice of the peace, chairman of the Medford board of selectmen, and representative of Medford to the colonial legislature; he returned his salary to the town treasury. Royall was elected to the Governor's Council in 1752 (serving until 1774), held the honorary military rank of Brigadier General of the Province, and served as an overseer of Harvard College. Royall also held pews at King's Chapel and Christ Church.

Royall was 19 in 1738 when he married Elizabeth McIntosh, 15, the daughter of a friend of Royall's father. The marriage was advantageous and confirmed Royall's place in the colonial elite. The couple had three daughters, Elizabeth (b. 1740), who died as a child, Mary (b. 1744), and Elizabeth (b. 1747). Royall commissioned several paintings of family members. In 1741, Robert Feke completed a group portrait that depicts Royall with his wife, sister Penelope, sister-in-law Mary McIntosh Palmer, and daughter Elizabeth. John Singleton Copley painted daughters Mary and Elizabeth in about 1758, wife Elizabeth in 1767-68, and Royall himself in about 1769.

Elizabeth McIntosh Royall died in 1770. In 1775, as war neared, the Royall daughters left Massachusetts for England. Royall fled Medford just three days before the Battle of Lexington, the first military engagement in the American Revolution. Failing to secure passage to Antigua, he sailed to Nova Scotia, instructing a friend to sell the people he had enslaved in Medford to finance his exile in London. After a year in Canada, Royall joined his daughters' families in England. He died of smallpox in 1781.

In his 1779 will, Royall emancipated Belinda Royall (later Belinda Sutton) and directed she be paid a pension from his seized estate. Sutton "had to petition the Massachusetts legislature six times to receive her due." Her successful 1783 suit became one of the first instances of reparations for slavery after American independence.

Harvard Law School 

In his will of 1779, Royall left land to Harvard College to establish the first professorship in law at the school. This bequest led to the founding of Harvard Law School in 1817. In 1936, to celebrate the university's tercentenary, Harvard alumnus and former English professor Pierre de Chaignon la Rose drew seals for each of Harvard's graduate schools. For Harvard Law School, la Rose adopted Royall's coat of arms, a blue shield adorned with three sheaves of wheat. This seal was adopted by the Harvard Corporation.

In 2016, the seal became the object of controversy, given Royall's prominence as the largest slaveholder in Massachusetts and the owner of a Caribbean slave-labor plantation. Students under the name "Royall Must Fall" (fashioned after the Rhodes Must Fall Movement) organized to have the seal removed. After several racist incidents within the Law School community, Law School Dean Martha L. Minow was pressured by students to create a committee of students, faculty, staff, and alumni to recommend whether to change the seal. In 2016, Harvard Law School officially decided to scrap the seal that contained Royall's arms.

References

1719 births
1781 deaths
People from Medford, Massachusetts
American slave traders
People of colonial Massachusetts
University and college founders
Deaths from smallpox
American slave owners
American justices of the peace